Quercus laurina is a species of oak. It is native primarily to Mexico (from Tamaulipas to Chiapas) and has also been found in Guatemala and El Salvador.

The species forms hybrids with Quercus affinis.

References

External links
photo of herbarium specimen collected in Nuevo León in 1993

laurina
Flora of Central America
Plants described in 1809
Oaks of Mexico
Trees of Puebla
Trees of Oaxaca
Cloud forest flora of Mexico
Flora of the Sierra Madre Oriental
Flora of the Sierra Madre de Oaxaca
Flora of the Sierra Madre del Sur
Flora of the Trans-Mexican Volcanic Belt
Flora of Los Tuxtlas
Taxa named by Aimé Bonpland